The DFL Foundation is a charitable foundation dedicated to social projects. It was founded in January 2009 by the Deutsche Fußball Liga and Die Liga – Fußballverband, under the name Bundesliga Foundation. It is based in Frankfurt, and the current CEO is Stefan Kiefer.

Purpose of the foundation
The DFL Foundation aims to use the popularity of German professional football and the Bundesliga to promote and support social projects. In addition to the commitment of individual professional footballers who have established their own foundations of this kind (for example Christoph Metzelder with the Christoph Metzelder Foundation or Manuel Neuer with his Manuel Neuer Kids Foundation) and the foundations of Bundesliga clubs (such as the foundation 1. FC Köln) or foundation from the German Football Association (German: Deutscher Fussball-Bund, DFB), the DFB-Kulturstiftung (DFB cultural Foundation), the foundation of the Bundesliga is, according to its statues, to promote the sport, education and international understanding. From this emerged four areas of focus: the foundation encourages children, supports people with disabilities, supports integration and promotes solidarity with other sports.

The foundation provides grants through application, but can also carry out their own projects and build partnerships.

Campaigns

In cooperation with the DFL, the most publicly successful campaign Sportler für Sportler (Athletes for Athletes) was developed in the spring of 2009. Through until 2010, TV commercials were broadcast in which well-known players and coaches from the Bundesliga and Olympic athletes from various sports, were shown asking for mutual support and calling on donations to the German Sports Aid.

The DFL Foundation also sponsors the junior elite support of the Deutsche Sporthilfe (German Sports Aid).

In July 2011, with the DFL-Supercup, the current major campaign started entitled Integration. Gelingt spielend. Through which nationwide advertising was made for the support of the integration of those with foreign origins. The football serves as a connecting element. Focus of the campaign, as for the Sportler für Sportler was a TV commercial with talented young players of the under-17 and under-19 teams and the Bundesliga players Gerald Asamoah, Mario Götze, İlkay Gündoğan and Sidney Sam. The music of the commercial was produced by Wolfgang Niedecken, singer of the band BAP.

In addition, dozens of smaller projects and campaigns from all four key working areas were promoted in recent years.

Capital resources and use
Main source of income of the foundation are the fines paid by the Bundesliga clubs for breach of licensing documents. Furthermore, funds flow into the foundation from fines pronounced by the DFB Sports Court.

Bodies of the foundation

Executive board
 Stefan Kiefer (Chairman)
 Kurt Gaugler (Deputy Chairman)
 Jörg Degenhart

Foundation board
 Reinhard Rauball (Chairman)
 Christian Seifert (Deputy Chairman)
 Harald Strutz
 Peter Peters
 Wolfgang Niersbach

Trustees
 Fritz Pleitgen (Chairman)
 Klaus-Peter Müller (Deputy Chairman)
 Tom Bender
 Heiner Brand
 Eberhard Gienger
 Britta Heidemann
 Eckart von Hirschhausen
 Maria Höfl-Riesch
 Klaus Kinkel
 Werner E. Klatten
 Joachim Król
 Peter Lohmeyer
 Peter Maffay
 Christoph Metzelder
 Wolfgang Niedecken
 Gerhard Schröder
 Matthias Steiner
 Edmund Stoiber
 Günter Weigl

Former members
 Herbert Hainer
 Roland Kentsch
 Steffi Jones
 Günter Netzer
 Wilfried Straub

References

External links
 

Sports organisations of Germany
2009 establishments in Germany